Nicholsville is an unincorporated community in Marengo County, Alabama, United States.  Nicholsville had a post office at one time, but it no longer exists.

Geography

Notable person
 Harwell Goodwin Davis, lawyer, Attorney General of Alabama, and President of Samford University from 1938 to 1958

References

Unincorporated communities in Alabama
Unincorporated communities in Marengo County, Alabama